Jeremy P. E. Spencer is a British biochemist, specialising in nutrition and cognitive function. He is Professor of Molecular Nutrition at the Department of Food and Nutritional Sciences of the University of Reading. He is an Institute for Scientific Information highly-cited researcher.

Biography 
Spencer studied Biochemistry at the University of Warwick and completed his PhD in Medical Biochemistry/Pharmacology at King's College London. Following several years as postdoctoral research fellow, at UC Davis and King's College London, he became a lecturer in Biochemistry at the King's College London GKT School of Medical Education. Since 2004, he is at the Department of Food and Nutritional Sciences at the University of Reading. He has received numerous awards, including the Silver Medal of the British Nutrition Society.

Research 
Spencer's research is focused on the interface between dietary phytochemicals and brain function. His initial work focused on the cellular and molecular mechanisms underlying neuronal death in Parkinson's disease and Alzheimer's disease. He could show that flavonoids and other polyphenols act as signalling molecules and not antioxidants in vivo.

References/Notes and references 

British nutritionists
21st-century British scientists
Living people
Alumni of the University of Warwick
Scientists from Cornwall
Academics of the University of Reading
Year of birth missing (living people)